The NZ South Island Party was a New Zealand regionalist political party, advocating greater representational say for the South Island. The party is no longer registered. Its aims were for the establishment of a regional assembly to handle issues relating directly to the South Island.

The party was based in the Otago region, and led by Dunedin publican Pat McCarrigan and former trade unionist Alan McDonald. It was not effective in achieving a wide acclaim, poor organisation and lack of financial resources probably being to blame. In the 1999 elections, the party put forward five electorate candidates and seven list candidates.

The party won no seats in 1999. It received 0.14% of the party vote (2,622 votes in total), and its highest percentage of the party vote in any seat was 1.5%. Its best showing in any electorate was to receive 2.6% of the electorate vote (over 800 votes).

The party's registration was cancelled at its own request on 14 June 2002, and it did not contest the 2002 elections.

The South Island Independence movement is not a political party in its own right and may not be considered as being connected with the South Island Party, but its aims are generally regarded as being closely linked with those expressed by the South Island Party.

References

Defunct political parties in New Zealand
Regionalist parties
South Island
Separatism in New Zealand
Single-issue political parties in New Zealand